Louis of Enghien (died March 17, 1394) titular Duke of Athens, Count of Brienne and Lord of Enghien in 1381–1394, Count of Conversano in 1356–1394. His coat-of-arms was "Enghien (gyronny of eight argent and sable crusilly or), a label gules bezantee".

Biography
Louis was the fourth son of Walter III of Enghien and Isabella of Brienne. When his mother divided the inheritance of his uncle Walter VI of Brienne among her sons, he received the title of Count of Conversano. 

In 1370, after Philip II of Taranto had secured the undisputed control of the Principality of Achaea against Maria of Bourbon, he was sent as Philip's bailli to the principality, which also included the lordship of Argos and Nauplia, ruled by his brother Guy. He remained in the position until 1371. From this position he and his brothers, including John of Enghien, wrote to the Doge of Venice to request Venetian aid in reclaiming the Duchy of Athens, which had been in their family's hands until 1311, from the Catalan Company, but help was not forthcoming. On the death of his childless nephew Walter V of Enghien in 1381, he also became titular Duke of Athens, Count of Brienne and Lord of Enghien.

He married Giovanna of Sanseverino, and they had four daughters: Margaret, Yolanda, Isabella, and Helena. On his death, at Conversano, on March 17, 1394, his titles were inherited by his eldest daughter
 Margaret (born 1365). In 1380, Margaret married John of Luxembourg, Lord of Beauvoir (1370–1397), son of Guy of Luxembourg and Mahaut of Châtillon, by whom she had issue, including 
 Peter I of Luxembourg, Count of St. Pol, of Brienne and of Conversano, and 
 John II of Luxembourg, Count of Ligny. 
Peter I married in his own turn, Margaret de Baux, by whom he had nine children: among them are Louis, Count of St. Pol, Brienne, and Conversano, and Jacquetta (mother of Queen consort Elizabeth Woodville).

Louis was one of the founding members of the Order of the Ship of King Charles III (1381).

References

Sources

External links
Coat of Arms in the Armorial du Hérault Vermandois

1394 deaths
Counts of Brienne
Counts of Conversano
Year of birth unknown
Baillis of the Principality of Achaea
14th-century people from the Principality of Achaea